This is a list of Canadian films released in 2018:

See also
 2018 in Canada
 2018 in Canadian television

References

External links
Feature Films Released In 2018 With Country of Origin Canada at IMDb

2018

Canada